Razak Simpson (born 15 July 1998) is a Ghanaian professional footballer who plays as a midfielder for Ghanaian Premier League side Ashanti Gold.

Career 
Simpson started his career with Elite Soccer Academy. In July 2019, he was signed by Obuasi-based team Ashanti Gold on a 5-year deal. He become the club's third signing of the season with Isaac Opoku Agyemang and Kwadwo Amoako being the first and second. He made his debut on 15 January 2020, coming on as a substitute in the 57 minute for Musa Mohammed in a goalless draw match against Legon Cities.

In March 2021, Simpson joined Liberty Professionals on loan until the end of the season. He made his debut against on 4 April 2021, in a 2–0 loss to Bechem United. The following weekend he played the full 90 minutes and helped Liberty to keep a clean sheet in a 4–0 victory over Elmina Sharks. During his loan spell, he featured in 16 league matches, only missing one within the second half of the season. He also won one man of the match award.

References

External links 

 
 

Living people
1998 births
Ghanaian footballers
Association football midfielders
Ashanti Gold SC players